Lois Braun (born 1949) is a Canadian writer. She was shortlisted for the Governor General's Award for English-language fiction at the 1986 Governor General's Awards for her debut short story collection A Stone Watermelon published by Turnstone Press.

Braun was born in Rosenfeld, Manitoba. Educated at the University of Winnipeg and the University of Manitoba, she worked as a school teacher in Altona until her retirement in 2003. She published three further collections of short stories, and won the Margaret Laurence Award from the Manitoba Book Awards in 2008 for The Penance Drummer.

Works
A Stone Watermelon (1986)
The Pumpkin-Eaters (1990)
The Montreal Cats (1995)
The Penance Drummer (2007)
Peculiar Lessons (2020)

References

1949 births
Living people
Canadian women short story writers
20th-century Canadian short story writers
Writers from Manitoba
Canadian Mennonites
20th-century Canadian women writers
21st-century Canadian women writers
21st-century Canadian short story writers
Mennonite writers